Okyereko is a town near Winneba Junction in the Gomoa East District in the Central Region of Ghana. It is located along the Kasoa-Winneba road on the Cape Coast-Accra Highway.

References 

Central Region (Ghana)
Communities in Ghana
Populated places in the Central Region (Ghana)